Sinijawi (Aymara sinija marsh, -wi a suffix to indicate a place, "a place of marsh", also spelled Sinejavi) is a  mountain in the Andes of Bolivia. It is located in the La Paz Department, José Manuel Pando Province, Catacora Municipality. Sinijawi lies southwest of Wari Kunka. An intermittent stream named Salla Uma ("cliff water", Sallahuma) originates north of the mountain. It flows to the west where it meets Jaruma River as a left tributary.

References 

Mountains of La Paz Department (Bolivia)